Stephanie Reece (born April 24, 1970) is a former professional tennis player from the United States.

Biography
Reece grew up in Indianapolis, where she attended North Central High School and featured in three IHSAA state championship winning teams. She played collegiate tennis at Indiana University for four years, earning five All-American selections.

As a professional player, Reece was most successful in the doubles format, with a top ranking of 79 in the world. She was doubles runner-up partnering Nana Miyagi at the Surabaya Open WTA Tour tournament in 1995 and appeared in the women's doubles main draw of all four grand slam tournaments in 1996, which was her final season on tour.

She is still involved in tennis as a coach at Zionsville High School in Indiana.

In September 2018, her ex husband Michael Hunn shot dead her two children in a murder-suicide.

WTA Tour finals

Doubles (0-1)

References

External links
 
 

1970 births
Living people
American female tennis players
Indiana Hoosiers women's tennis players
Tennis players from Indianapolis